Men'll Be Boys is the fourth studio album by American country music artist Billy Dean. It was released in 1994 (see 1994 in country music) on Liberty Records as his final album for the label before Liberty's country music division was merged with Capitol Records Nashville. The album produced only two singles in "Cowboy Band" and "Men Will Be Boys", which respectively reached #24 and #60 on the Billboard country singles charts.

The album includes two cover songs: "I Will Be Here" had been released by Steven Curtis Chapman on his 1989 album More to This Life, and "Misery and Gin" had been released by Merle Haggard on his 1980 album Back to the Barrooms.

Track listing

Credits
Album produced by Jimmy Bowen for Lynwood Productions and Billy Dean; "Starting Over Again" and "I Will Be Here" produced by Chuck Howard.

Musicians
 John Catchings — cello
 Billy Dean — lead vocals, electric guitar
 Dan Dugmore — steel guitar
 Glen Duncan — fiddle
 Paul Franklin — steel guitar
 Rob Hajacos — fiddle
 John Barlow Jarvis — piano
 Terry McMillan — harmonica, percussion, congas, shaker, tambourine, cowbell, wind chimes
 Steve Nathan — synthesizer
 Matt Rollings — piano
 Eric Silver — violin
 Michael Spriggs — acoustic guitar, gut string guitar
 Biff Watson — acoustic guitar
 Kris Wilkinson — viola
 John Willis — electric guitar
 Lonnie Wilson — drums
 Glenn Worf — bass guitar

 Background vocalists
 Michael Black
 Carol Chase
 Billy Dean
 Timothy Hedge
 Doc Hollister
 Cindy Richardson
 Harry Stinson
 Dennis Wilson
 Curtis Young

Chart performance

References

1994 albums
Albums produced by Jimmy Bowen
Billy Dean albums
Liberty Records albums